The Former Sanhe Bank is a historical bank building in Gushan District, Kaohsiung, Taiwan.

History
The bank building was the branch of Sanjushi-Ginko Bank set up in 1921. In 1933, the bank was changed to Sanwa Bank after series of merging negotiation. After the handover of Taiwan from Japan to the Republic of China in 1945, the Kaohsiung branch of Sanwa Bank was merged with other branches into the Bank of Taiwan. The bank building was then turned into the property of Sinbin Police Station under the Kaohsiung City Police Department. In 1990, the police station was moved to its current location due to space congestion. The building has then been idle.

Architecture
The bank uses reinforced concrete beam-column structure. Its exterior walls are covered with khaki face bricks and stucco washing finish. Its ceiling is mud-plastered with bamboo inside.

Transportation
The building is accessible within walking distance north of Sizihwan Station of Kaohsiung MRT.

See also
 List of tourist attractions in Taiwan

References

1921 establishments in Taiwan
Buildings and structures in Kaohsiung
Former police stations in Taiwan
Tourist attractions in Kaohsiung
Former bank buildings